The presence of a sizeable Ecuadorian in Spain community in Spain dates back to the early 2000s.

Numbers
The number of Ecuadorian citizens living in Spain peaked at 497,799 in the year 2005. Since then, it has decreased to 135,275 as of 2018, because many Ecuadorians acquired Spanish citizenship by naturalization, and also because some of them moved to other European countries during Spain's economic crisis of 2008–2014. When counting all people born in Ecuador and living in Spain (including Spanish citizens), their number as of 2018 is 404,414.

Notable people

Foreign population of Ecuadorian citizenship in Spain

See also
Ecuador–Spain relations
Immigration to Spain
1998–99 Ecuador banking crisis

References

History of Ecuador
Ethnic groups in Spain
Ecuadorian diaspora